Isaka is a town in Tanzania. Isaka may also refer to:

Isaka (name)
Isaka Dam in Japan 
Isaka-Ivondro, a town and commune in Madagascar
Isaka river - a river in Vatovavy, Madagascar.

See also
Issaka
Isakas